Zhao Erxun (23 May 1844 – 3 September 1927), courtesy name Cishan, art name Wubu, was a Chinese political and military officeholder who lived in the late Qing dynasty. He served in numerous high-ranking positions under the Qing government, including Viceroy of Sichuan, Viceroy of Huguang, and Viceroy of the Three Northeast Provinces. After the fall of the Qing dynasty, he became a historian and was the lead editor of the Draft History of Qing (Qing Shi Gao).

Life

Early career 
Zhao's ancestral roots were in Tieling, Fengtian Province (present-day Liaoning Province). His family was under the Plain Blue Banner of the Han Chinese Eight Banners. He sat for the provincial-level imperial examination in 1867 and obtained the position of a juren. In 1874, he sat for the palace-level examination and emerged as a jinshi, after which he was admitted to the Hanlin Academy as a bianxiu (編修; compiler and editor).

The first position Zhao held was an assistant examiner for the provincial-level imperial examination in Hubei Province. Later, he was promoted to a Supervising Censor of the Ministry of Works. In 1893, he served as a prefect in Guizhou Province and was promoted to a daotai (道台; a type of military official). He was transferred to Guangdong Province later. He subsequently served as the anchashi (按察使; Provincial Judicial Commissioner) in Anhui and Shaanxi provinces, and later as the buzhengshi (布政使; Provincial Financial Commissioner) of Gansu, Shanxi and Xinjiang provinces.

In November 1902, Zhao was appointed as the xunfu (Provincial Governor) of Shanxi Province. A year later, he was made acting xunfu of Hunan Province. In August 1904, he was recalled to the imperial capital, Beijing, to serve as acting Secretary of Revenue. One year later, he was sent to Fengtian Province to serve as "General of Shengjing".

Activities in Tibet and as Viceroy of Sichuan and the Three Northeast Provinces 
In March 1907, Zhao replaced Xi Liang as the Viceroy of Sichuan but never assumed office. His brother, Zhao Erfeng, succeeded him as the Viceroy of Sichuan. Around August, when Zhang Zhidong was recalled to Beijing to serve on the Grand Council, Zhao was appointed as Viceroy of Huguang to replace Zhang. He was also given the honorary appointments of Secretary of Defence and Censor-in-Chief. During his tenure as Viceroy of Huguang, he set up the Hubei Law School.

Zhao and his brother Zhao Erfeng extended Qing rule into Eastern Tibet (Kham) and sent an army to Lhasa in 1908. This initially worked with the restored 13th Dalai Lama but later drove him out after strong disagreements about a conflict between Lamas in Eastern Tibet and the Qing government in Sichuan. It has been suggested that this conflict, along with an increase in taxes, caused the September 1911 rebellion in Sichuan. Han Suyin takes a different view and says that the main issue in the conflict was control over a planned railway that would have linked Sichuan to the rest of China.

In March 1908, Zhao was reassigned to serve as the Viceroy of Sichuan again. Around April 1911, he was transferred to Manchuria to serve as the Viceroy of the Three Northeast Provinces (or Viceroy of Manchuria) and awarded an honorary title as an Imperial Commissioner. During his tenure, he established the Fengtian Military School and promoted Zhang Zuolin to deputy military chief of the Fengtian Citizen Security Association. He served as Viceroy of the Three Northeast Provinces until the Xinhai Revolution overthrew the Qing dynasty in early 1912.

Under the Republic 
In March 1912, the Provisional Assembly of the Republic of China passed a bill appointing Zhao as the Viceroy of Fengtian Province, giving him control over Manchuria just like when he was Viceroy of the Three Northeast Provinces. However, Zhao resigned on 3 November and returned to Beijing. In 1914, Yuan Shikai appointed Zhao as the director of the Qing History Bureau to create a Draft History of Qing (Qing Shi Gao).

In March 1925, when Duan Qirui convened the Shanhou Conference, he nominated Zhao to lead the conference. In June, when the Provisional National Council was established, Zhao was nominated to lead the council.

Zhao died in Beijing in 1927. His tomb is located at the north of Shenshan Village, Huaibei Town, Huairou District, Beijing.

References

Citations

Sources 

 
 

Qing dynasty politicians from Liaoning
History of Tibet
1844 births
1927 deaths
Republic of China historians
Qing dynasty historians
Politicians from Tieling
Historians from Liaoning
Political office-holders in Hubei
Governors of Sichuan
Political office-holders in Liaoning
Viceroys of Three Northeast Provinces
19th-century Chinese historians
20th-century Chinese historians
Han Chinese Plain Blue Bannermen
Viceroys of Huguang
Viceroys of Sichuan